Diving was contested at the 1974 Asian Games in Aryamehr Swimming Pool, Tehran, Iran from September 2 to September 7, 1974.

Medalists

Men

Women

Medal table

References 

 New Straits Times, September 3–9, 1974
 The Straits Times, September 3–9, 1974

External links
Medals

 
1974 Asian Games events
1974
Asian Games
1974 Asian Games